Karmaveer Kakasaheb Wagh Institute of Engineering Education & Research, Nashik (KKWIEER) is the oldest engineering college in Nashik.

The institute was established in the year 1984 at Bhausahebnagar (Tal. Niphad, Dist. Nashik) and shifted to Nashik City in September 1986. A land of 8.2 hectares was generously donated by Shri. Kakusheth Udesi of Hirabai Haridas Charitable Trust, Mumbai. The Society started building infrastructure at this campus (known as Hirabai Haridas Vidya Nagari) in the year 1987. As on date it is fully developed and provides accommodation for the College building, office, classrooms, drawing halls, laboratories, workshops, etc. The building with a built-up area of 32,199 Sq.m. is one of the largest buildings in the City. All laboratories, classrooms, etc. are designed as per the needs of the students. The institution has a good collection of reference books and textbooks, periodicals, and journals.

The institute is approved by the All India Council of Technical Education (AICTE), New Delhi, and the Government of Maharashtra is permanently affiliated to Savitribai Phule Pune University and has recognition under sections 2(F) and 12(B) of (UGC ACT 1956). The institute is adjudged as Grade 'A' by the Government of Maharashtra. The institute is Accredited by National Assessment & Accreditation Council (NAAC) with an ‘A’ Grade, Accredited by HLACT International. It is the only institute in Nashik to be grouped thrice under the “Platinum Category” by the AICTE-CII Survey of Industry Linked Institutes and according to the NIRF ranking survey 2016 ranked 85th amongst all engineering institutes in India. The Teaching and Non-Teaching Staff of the institute is a blend of senior experienced and young dynamic faculty members devoted to the noble cause of education. Many of our students were the toppers in the university examinations and are in great demand from Multinational Companies in India and Abroad. Our training and placement wing tries hard to seek good jobs for our students. In addition to academics, the students are engaged in sports and cultural activities to provide healthy relief from rigorous routines. The institute is having spacious grounds and modern facilities for both indoor and outdoor games and an ultra-modern Gymnasium for bodybuilding and fitness. Due to able and proper guidance and motivation, many of our students have topped at University, National, and International levels and different sports events.

The institute at present provides four-year courses leading to a Bachelor’s Degree from Savitribai Phule Pune University in ten disciplines Civil, Computer, Mechanical, Electronics & Telecommunication, Electrical, Information Technology, Chemical, Artificial Intelligence and Data Science, Robotics and Automation and Computer Science and Design and six post-graduate studies in Civil Engineering, Electronics and Telecommunication Engineering, Electrical Engineering, Master of Computer Applications (MCA) & Master of Business Administration (MBA). The Institute has also established Research Centers for the Doctor of Philosophy (Ph.D.) program in the Electrical, Civil, and Computer Engineering Departments.

Courses offered

U.G. Courses
 Computer Engineering (120)
 Electronics and Telecommunication Engineering (120)
 Civil Engineering (120)
 Mechanical Engineering (120)
 Electrical Engineering (120)
 Chemical Engineering (60)
 Information Technology (60)
 Artificial Intelligence and Data Science (120) 
 Robotics and Automation (60) 
 Computer Science and Design (60)

P.G. Courses
 Master's in Production (Manufacturing and Automation) (18)
 Master's in Electrical (Power System) (18)
 Master's in Electronics ( VLSI and Embedded System) (18)
 Master of Computer Application (120)
 Master in Business Administration (60)

Research Centre(Ph.D.)
 Doctor of Philosophy in Production
 Doctor of Philosophy in Civil
 Doctor of Philosophy in Electrical
 Doctor of Philosophy in Computer

Events and clubs
KKWIEER conducts National Level technical and cultural events annually.

Technical events include:
 KARMAVEER EXPO (Electrical Department)
 FORCE (Civil Department)
 EQUINOX (Computer Department)
 INVASION (Production Department)
 MECHEAVEN (Mechanical Department)
 ABACUS (MCA Department)
 ITiazza (Information Technology)
 TELEKINESIS (Electronics and Telecommunications Department)
 CHEMFEST (Chemical Department)
 CSR Diary (Student Volunteering Department)
 Maverick (MBA Dept)
MAFFICK is the annual cultural festival of KKWIEER.

The college also has active student bodies:
Team Vector (Robocon Team)
 Mozillian's Arena (Computer Department)
 Debuggers Club (Computer Department)
 CESA (Civil Engineering Students' Association)
 PESA (Production Engineering Students' Association)
 MESA (Mechanical Engineering Students' Association)
 SAE (Society for Automotive Engineers)
 CSI (Computer Society of India)
 ISTE (Indian Society for Technical Education)
 WHITE-SPOT(Short Film Production)
 NSS (National Social Service Scheme)
 ACES (Association of Chemical Engineering Society)
 SAEE (Student's Association of Electronics Engineering)
 CASI Global, New York (Student Chapter of CASI New York for Global Certifications on CSR & Sustainability)
 REDX-KKWIEER-CLUB (Institute level)

Facilities
The campus houses a Polytechnic, Boys/Girls Hostel with the mess, medical, and laundry. It has sporting facilities like Cricket/Football ground, Tennis, Basketball and Volleyball court.

All India Council for Technical Education
Engineering colleges in Maharashtra
Education in Nashik
Colleges affiliated to Savitribai Phule Pune University
Educational institutions established in 1984
1984 establishments in Maharashtra